Nicolas Delvecchio (born 12 March 1998) is an Italian footballer who plays as a forward for Lanciano. He is the son of former Italian international footballer Marco Delvecchio.

Club statistics

Club

Notes

References

1998 births
Living people
Italian footballers
Italian expatriate footballers
Association football forwards
Serie D players
Serie C players
Lupa Roma F.C. players
Virtus Francavilla Calcio players
Olbia Calcio 1905 players
A.S.D. Igea Virtus Barcellona players
Bangor City F.C. players
F.C. Boca Gibraltar players
Expatriate footballers in Wales
Expatriate footballers in Gibraltar
Footballers from Rome